Iridinidae is a family of medium-sized freshwater mussels, aquatic bivalve mollusks in the order Unionida.

Genera
Genera within the family Iridinidae:
 Aspatharia Bourguignat, 1885 (monotypic)
 Chambardia Bourguignat, 1891
 Chambardia bozasi
 Chambardia hartmanni
 Chambardia nyassaensis
 Chambardia rubens
 Chambardia trapezia
 Chambardia wahlbergi
 Chambardia wissmanni
 Chelidonopsis Ancey, 1887
 Iridina Lamarck, 1819
 Iridina exotica  Lamarck, 1819
 Iridina ovatus Swainson, 1823
 Moncetia Bourguignat, 1886
 Mutela Scopoli, 1777
 Pleiodon Conrad, 1834

References

Bivalve families
Unionida